Morelos is a semi-urban municipality in the metropolitan area of Zacatecas City in the Mexican state of Zacatecas.

Geography
It borders the municipalities of Calera to the northwest, Pánuco to the northeast, Vetagrande to the east, and Zacatecas City to the south.

As of 2009, 71% of the land in Morelos is used for agriculture. The remainder is covered by matorral (13.7%), grassland (12.6%) and urban areas (2.4%). The municipality lies in the endorheic basin of El Salado.

Morelos has a temperate semi-arid climate with dry winters.

History
In pre-Hispanic times, the Morelos area was inhabited by the Cagihua tribe of the Zacateco people. Francisco de Ibarra passed through the area on 1 September 1554, giving it the name of Arroyo de los Chupaderos. Between 1610 and 1620, Antonio de Figueroa built and operated the first ranch in the area.

After Mexican independence, Chupaderos was administered by the municipality of Vetagrande. It was declared a separate municipality on 8 February 1869 and its first municipal assembly convened in 1871. On 5 May 1894, the municipality changed its name from Chupaderos to Morelos in honour of José María Morelos. The municipal seat inaugurated its first power plant in 1955 and its first potable water supply in 1966.

Administration
The municipal government of Morelos comprises a president, a councillor (Spanish: síndico), and ten trustees (regidores), six elected by relative majority and four by proportional representation. The current president of the municipality is Margarita Robles de Santiago.

Demographics
In the 2020 Mexican Census, the municipality of Morelos recorded a population of 13,207 inhabitants living in 3614 households. The 2010 Census recorded a population of 11,493 inhabitants in Morelos.

INEGI lists 28 inhabited localities in the municipality, of which two are classified as urban:
the municipal seat, also called Morelos, which recorded a population of 7538 inhabitants in the 2020 Census; and

Economy and infrastructure

Economic activities in Morelos include agriculture and small businesses. Crops grown include corn, bean, barley, oats and chiles. CRUCEN (Centro Regional Universitario Centro Norte), a regional centre of the agriculturally focused Chapingo Autonomous University, is located in Morelos.

Federal Highways 45, 45D (the Zacatecas City bypass), and 54 all intersect in the municipality. Zacatecas International Airport is located in the northern part of the municipality.

Peñoles operated the Francisco I. Madero zinc mine in the southwestern part of the municipality from 2001 to 2020.

References

Further reading

Municipalities of Zacatecas
1869 establishments in Mexico
States and territories established in 1869